Collinsia bartsiifolia is a species of flowering plant in the plantain family known by the common name white blue-eyed Mary.

It is endemic to California, where it is widespread in the mountain ranges and deserts and found in several habitat types.

Description
Collinsia bartsiifolia is an annual herb producing a slender, hairy stem up to about 35 centimeters long. It is lined with a few thick, narrowly oblong leaves with edges slightly rolled under.

The inflorescence is an interrupted series of whorls of flowers. The flower is white to lavender to purple, sometimes bicolored, pouched and folded, with two toothed upper lobes and three notched lower lobes.

External links
Jepson Manual Treatment of Collinsia bartsiifolia
USDA Plants Profile for Collinsia bartsiifolia
Collinsia bartsiifolia — U.C. Photo gallery

bartsiifolia
Endemic flora of California
Flora of the California desert regions
Flora of the Klamath Mountains
Flora of the Sierra Nevada (United States)
Natural history of the California chaparral and woodlands
Natural history of the California Coast Ranges
Natural history of the Mojave Desert
Natural history of the San Francisco Bay Area
Plants described in 1846
Flora without expected TNC conservation status